II is the second studio album by Maylene and the Sons of Disaster. It was released on March 20, 2007, on Ferret Records.

The album sold about 6,000 copies in the United States in its first week, earning them their first placement in the Billboard 200 at #156.

A music video was produced for "Dry the River" and found substantial airplay on MTV2's Headbangers Ball. It has the band performing in the shallow end of a creek and the surrounding forest at night. They are eventually subdued by apparent hunters and dragged through the woods, as depicted on the album cover. Contrary to popular belief, Underoath ex-drummer Aaron Gillespie does not appear in the video. The song "Darkest of Kin" also had a music video.

The song "Memories of the Grove" is featured in the video games Tony Hawk's Proving Ground and a downloadable track on Guitar Hero II

Track listing

Personnel
Maylene and the Sons of Disaster
 Dallas Taylor – lead vocals
 Scott Collum – lead guitar
 Josh Williams – rhythm guitar
 Roman Haviland – bass, backing vocals
 Lee Turner – drums

Additional personnel
 Jacob Bunton – additional guitar
 Tim Carroll – bowed bass
 Rodney Reaves – acoustic guitar, percussion, additional vocals
 Michael Swann – additional guitar, slide guitar
 Jason Elgin – engineer, mixing, producer, percussion
 Roger Lian – mastering
 Stephen Hutton – management

References

2007 albums
02
Albums with cover art by Sons of Nero